Monte Incudine is a mountain in the department of Corse-du-Sud on the island of Corsica, France.
It is the highest peak in the Monte Incudine massif.

Location

The peak is on the border between the communes of Zicavo to the northwest and Sartène to the southeast.
The Ruisseau de l'Incudine rises on its northwest slope.

Physical

Hiking

The hike to the summit is long, and very steep in some places.
Lower down, vegetation includes Laricio pine forests and green meadows.
Higher up it becomes more rocky, and the summit is a hugh slab of rock strewn with boulders.
Often the summit is shrouded by clouds, and snow tends to persist.
However, the summit provides an excellent panorama of the Corsican mountains.

Gallery

Notes

Sources

Mountains of Corse-du-Sud